Eileen Hurly (born 6 May 1932, Benoni, South Africa), former Southern Transvaal and South Africa cricketer
Hurly Baronets

See also
Hurley (disambiguation)